Kwame Ayew (born 28 December 1973) is a Ghanaian former professional footballer who played as a striker.

During nearly 20 years he played professionally in six countries, mainly in Portugal where he appeared for four teams in the 90s, amassing Primeira Liga totals of 131 games and 51 goals over the course of six seasons.

Club career
Born in Tamale, Ayew started playing professionally in France at only 17, spending a couple of Ligue 1 seasons with FC Metz, then moved to Qatar with Al Ahli SC and played in another country in the following two years, Italy, appearing and scoring sparingly for U.S. Lecce (for instance, he netted four goals in 1993–94's Serie A as his club ranked last with only 28 goals, a competition-worst).

Ayew moved to Portugal in 1995, and would remain there in the following five years. He started with U.D. Leiria and Vitória de Setúbal, then impressed at Boavista F.C. also in the Primeira Liga, scoring 15 times in 27 games in his second season to earn his team a best-ever at the time runner-up place, behind neighbours FC Porto.

After nearly 50 official goals for Boavista, Ayew moved to country giants Sporting Clube de Portugal. Even though he was never an automatic first-choice (having to battle for a starting berth with Alberto Acosta, Edmílson and Mbo Mpenza), he netted seven goals in 13 starts as the Lions ended an 18-year drought and conquered the national championship.

In the following years Ayew would play in Turkey (two seasons) and China (five), rarely settling with a club. In January 2007 the 33-year-old returned to former side Setúbal, contributing solidly as the Sadinos avoided top flight relegation by one point; he retired from the game shortly after.

International career
Ayew was a member of the Ghana national team that won the bronze medal at the 1992 Summer Olympics in Barcelona, scoring six goals in as many games. In total, he won 25 senior caps.

Education
Ayew attended Ghana Senior High School in Tamale.

Personal life
Football ran in Ayew's family: his brothers Abedi and Sola also played football, the former spending a big part of his career with Olympique de Marseille. His nephews, André, Jordan and Rahim, also played the sport professionally.

Career statistics

Honours

Player
Boavista
Supertaça de Portugal: 1997

Sporting
Primeira Liga: 1999–2000

Kocaelispor
Turkish Cup: 2001–02

International
Ghana
 Olympic Bronze Medal: 1992

References

External links
 
 
 
 
 

1973 births
Living people
Ghanaian footballers
Association football forwards
FC Metz players
Al Ahli SC (Doha) players
Serie A players
Serie B players
U.S. Lecce players
Primeira Liga players
U.D. Leiria players
Qatar Stars League players
Vitória F.C. players
Boavista F.C. players
Sporting CP footballers
Süper Lig players
Yimpaş Yozgatspor footballers
Kocaelispor footballers
Chinese Super League players
Beijing Renhe F.C. players
Changsha Ginde players
Ghana international footballers
1994 African Cup of Nations players
1996 African Cup of Nations players
2000 African Cup of Nations players
Footballers at the 1992 Summer Olympics
Olympic footballers of Ghana
Olympic bronze medalists for Ghana
Olympic medalists in football
Medalists at the 1992 Summer Olympics
Ghanaian expatriate footballers
Expatriate footballers in France
Expatriate footballers in Qatar
Expatriate footballers in Italy
Expatriate footballers in Portugal
Expatriate footballers in Turkey
Expatriate footballers in China
Ghanaian expatriate sportspeople in France
Ghanaian expatriate sportspeople in Italy
Ghanaian expatriate sportspeople in Portugal
Ghanaian expatriate sportspeople in Turkey
Ghanaian expatriate sportspeople in China
People from Tamale, Ghana
Ghana Senior High School (Tamale) alumni
Ayew family